Studor is a small settlement in the hills northwest of Gorenja Vas in the Municipality of Gorenja Vas–Poljane in the Upper Carniola region of Slovenia.

References

External links

Studor on Geopedia

Populated places in the Municipality of Gorenja vas-Poljane